Miss France 2017 was the 87th edition of the Miss France pageant, held on December 17, 2016 at Park&Suites Arena in Montpellier. 

It was the first time that the pageant took place in Montpellier and in the Languedoc-Roussillon region.

The ceremony was held at TF1, and was presented by Jean-Pierre Foucault and the national director Sylvie Tellier.

The winner was Miss French Guiana, Alicia Aylies, who gave to her region its first ever Miss France title. The winner succeeded Iris Mittenaere, Miss France 2016 from Nord-Pas-de-Calais.

Results

Preparation
The 30 contestants, Iris Mittenaere and the national director Sylvie Tellier had travelled to Reunion Island from November, 23 to December, 1st.
The rehearsals took place in Montpellier.

The theme of the 2017 event was Le Noël des Miss (The Misses' Christmas).  Each round centered around a different theme related to the celebration of Christmas.

Contestants

Ranking

First round 
A jury composed of partners (internal and external) of the company Miss France pre-selects 12 young women, during an interview that took place on 15 December.

Second round 
The 50% jury and the 50% public choose the five candidates who can still be elected. A ranking of 1 to 12 is established for each of the two parties.

Last round

Special prizes

Judges 
The names of the judges were announced on November, 24 :

Notes about the contestants
 Miss French Guiana, Alicia Aylies, was born in Martinique.
 Miss Île-de-France, Meggy Pyaneeandee, was born in Paris from Mauritians parents.
 Miss Côte d'Azur, Maria Pavelin, was born in Zagreb, Croatia. She decided to withdraw because of a job opportunity. Her first runner-up Jade Scotte took over. 
 Miss Languedoc-Roussillon, Aurore Kichenin, has got Reunionese, Polish and Russian origins.
 Miss Reunion Island, Ambre Nguyen, has got Vietnamese origins.
 Miss Lorraine, Justine Kamara, has got Guadeloupean and Guinean origins.
 Miss Limousin, Romane Komar, has got Swedish origins.
 Miss Pays de Loire, Carla Loones, has got Spanish and Flemish origins.
 the original Miss Centre, Loire Valley, Margaux Legrand-Guérineau, withdrew from her title for personal reasons. Her first runner-up Cassandre Joris assumed the title. On November, 4, Legrand-Guerineau announced that she was actually dethroned for some photos which were contrary to the rules of the pageant.
 The medium age of the contestants is 19,9 and the medium height is 1,75 m / 5 ft 9 in.

National and International placements 
 French Guiana wins for the first time ever the Miss France pageant.
 Tahiti is placed for fifth consecutive time, for the fifth consecutive time in the top five and for the second consecutive time as second runner-up.
 Alsace is placed for fourth consecutive year.
 Aquitaine is placed for third consecutive year.
 Brittany and Reunion Island are placed for second consecutive year.
 Lorraine is placed for the first time since the Miss France 2009 pageant.
 Normandy is placed for the first time since the Miss France 2011 pageant.
 French Guiana is placed for the first time since the Miss France 2012 pageant.
 Ile-de-France, Guadeloupe and Picardy are placed for the first time since the Miss France 2015 pageant.
Miss Languedoc-Roussillon, Aurore Kichenin placed as a Top 5 Finalist in Miss World 2017, held in Sanya, China.

References

External links

Miss France
2016 in France
December 2016 events in France
2016 beauty pageants